Euharamiyida also known as Eleutherodontida, is clade of early mammals or mammal-like cynodonts from the Middle Jurassic to Early Cretaceous of Eurasia and possibly North America. The group is sometimes considered a sister group to Multituberculata, or part of an earlier divergence within the synapsid line. It is disputed whether or not they are related to the Haramiyids from the Late Triassic, such as Haramiyavia. The morphology of their teeth indicates that they were herbivorous or omnivorous. Some members of the group are known to be arboreal, including gliding forms similar to modern flying squirrels or colugos.

Evolution 
The position of euharamyidans is contested. They are either considered crown group mammals as members of Allotheria, related to multituberculates, or they are considered to stem-group mammals within the Mammaliaformes. The position is often dependent on the relationships of euharamiyids to the Late Triassic haramiyids such as Haramiyavia and Thomasia. In some studies, the two groups are recovered as unrelated.

Phylogeny

Taxa
The following taxonomy follows Mao et al. (2022) unless otherwise cited.
 Cryoharamiya
 Maiopatagium
 Millosodon
 Sharypovoia
 Sineleutherus
 Woodeatonia
 ?Allostaffia
 ?Hahnodontidae Sigogneau-Russell, 1991
 ?Megaconus
 ?Gondwanatheria
 Arboroharamiyidae Zheng et al., 2013
 Arboroharamiya
 Vilevolodon
 Xianshou
 Kermackodontidae Butler and Hooker, 2005 (="Eleutherodontidae" Kermack et al., 1998) (considered by other studies to be multituberculates)
 Kermackodon
 Butlerodon
 Shenshouidae Mao and Meng, 2019
 Qishou
 Shenshou

References

 
Jurassic first appearances
Jurassic extinctions
Taxa named by Shundong Bi
Taxa named by Yuanqing Wang
Taxa named by Xia Sheng
Taxa named by Jin Meng